Girraween is a suburb of Sydney, in the state of New South Wales, Australia. Girraween is located 30 km west of the Sydney central business district, in the local government area of Cumberland Council and is part of the Greater Western Sydney region.

History
Girraween is an Aboriginal word meaning place of flowers. It was first inhabited by the Darug people. This area was part of the estate of D'Arcy Wentworth, who was honoured in the naming of the nearby suburb of Wentworthville.

Demographics
At the 2016 census, in Girraween. Less than half (37.9%) of people were born in Australia, with the top other countries of birth being India 26.9%, Sri Lanka 10.6%, Malta 2.5%, China 2.2% and Philippines 1.4%. In Girraween, 70.0% of people spoke a language other than English at home. The other most common languages spoken were Tamil 18.3%, Gujarati 9.4%, Hindi 6.4%, Telugu 4.4% and Maltese 2.5%. The top responses for religious affiliation were Hinduism 42.5%, Catholic 19.8% and No Religion 8.5%.

At the 2011 census, in Girraween. Just under half (44.6%) of people were born in Australia, with the top other countries of birth being India 15.8%, Sri Lanka 9.8% and Malta 3.6%. In Girraween, 59.4% of people spoke a language other than English at home. The other most common languages spoken were Tamil 16.2%, Hindi 4.2% and Maltese 3.5%. The top responses for religious affiliation were Catholic 28.1%, Hinduism 27.5% and Anglican 8.2%.

Transport
Girraween is serviced by the 705 bus route from Blacktown to Parramatta. There is no railway station although it is a short walk through Civic Park, to Pendle Hill Railway Station. Toongabbie Railway Station is also easily accessible by walk or car.

Schools 
 Girraween High School (Selective high school) 
 Girraween Public School
 St Anthony's Girraween (Catholic school)

Sport and recreation
 Girraween Eagles and Girraween Park.
 Civic Park, just over the eastern border in Pendle Hill has a basketball court, a netball court, tennis courts, barbecue areas and a playground area.
 Girraween Little Athletics Club is based at CV Kelly Park.

References

Suburbs of Sydney
Cumberland Council, New South Wales